Arnt Gudleik Hagen (17 August 1928  –  27 July 2007) was a Norwegian politician for the Centre Party.

He was born in Eid.

He was elected to the Norwegian Parliament from Møre og Romsdal in 1965, and was re-elected on two occasions. He had previously served in the position of deputy representative during the term 1961–1965.

Hagen was a member of Molde city council during the term 1963–1967.

References

1928 births
2007 deaths
Members of the Storting
Centre Party (Norway) politicians
20th-century Norwegian politicians